Universitate (University) is a metro station located in University Square, Bucharest, near the University of Bucharest, the University of Architecture, the National Theatre Bucharest and the InterContinental Hotel. The station is one of the deepest in the whole system, with a narrow platform, built around huge pillars designed to sustain the weight of the lobby/subway and the huge statue of Constantin Cristocea in the square above.

The station was opened on 24 October 1987 as part of the extension from Piața Unirii to Pipera.

References

Bucharest Metro stations
Railway stations opened in 1987
1987 establishments in Romania